This is an incomplete list of current/former U.S. Army posts in South Korea, although a number have been closed or are in caretaker status:

United States Army installations in South Korea 

 Camp Ames
 Camp Bonifas - turned over to ROK in 2006
 Camp Carroll
 Camp Casey
 Camp Castle - closed
 Camp Coiner -  northern portion turned over to US Embassy in Dec 2017, southern portion remains open
 Camp Colbern - closed
 USAG Daegu
 Camp Eagle - closed
 Camp Edwards - closed
 Camp Essayons - closed
 Camp Falling Water - closed
 Camp Garry Owen - closed
 Camp George
 Camp Giant - closed
 Camp Greaves - closed
 Hannam Village - closed
 Camp Henry
 Camp Hialeah - closed
 Camp Holiday - closed
 Camp Hovey 
 Camp Howze - closed
 USAG Humphreys
 Camp Indian - closed
 Camp Irwin - closed
 Camp Jackson - closed
 Camp Kim - closed 
 Camp Kyle - closed
 Camp Liberty Bell
 Camp Long - closed
 Camp Long Jon
 Camp Market - closed 
 Camp McNabb (Jeju Island) – closed
 Camp Mercer, Seoul - 44th Engineering Battalion 
 Camp Mobile
 Camp Mosier (U.S. 43rd Mash Unit and 377th Air Ambulance) - closed
 Camp Nimble - closed
 Camp Page - closed
 Camp Red Cloud - turned over to ROK in 2018
 Camp Sarafi - closed
 Camp Sears - closed
 Camp St Barbara - turned over to ROK in 1971
 Camp Stanley - closed
 Camp Walker
 USAG Yongsan
 H220 Heliport - turned over to ROK in May 2022
 K-16 Air Base
 Kunsan Pol Terminal Site
 Madison Site
 Masan Ammunition Depot
 Seobingo Compound
 Pier #8
 Tango (U.S. Army)
 Yong Pyong

Installations in the Kaesong-Munsan Corridor 
"Korea’s mountainous terrain channels traditional invasion routes along narrow north-south axes as well as broader plains in the Western (Kaesong-Munsan) Corridor and the Chorwon-Uijongbu Valley."

 Cp. Alamo
 Cp. Alex Williams
 Cp. Ames, Taejon
 Cp. Ashworth (Was * Cp. Semper Fidelis)
 Cp. Baker
 Cp. Beard
 Cp. Beaumont
 Cp. Beavers, ~ Fort Beavers, Munsan
 Blue Lancer Valley
 Cp. Bonifas (Was * Cp. Kitty Hawk)
 Cp. Bray
 Cp. Britannia
 Cp. Brown
 Cp. Carroll, Waegwan 
 Cp. Casey 
 Cp. Castle 
 Cp. Clinch
 Cp. Coiner, Seoul
 Cp. Colbern, Seoul
 Cp. Coursen
 Cp. Crawford
 Cp. Custer
 Cp. Daughtry
 Cp. Dodge
 Cp. Eagle, Wonju 
 Cp. Echo Hill
 Cp. Edwards
 Cp. Eiler
 Cp. El Paso, Chin-chon
 Cp. Essayons
 Cp. Ethan Allen
 Cp. Falling Water 
 Cp. Garry Owen (Was * Cp. Rice)
 Cp. George, Taegu 
 Cp. Giant
 Cp. Grant
 Cp. Gray
 Cp. Greaves
 Cp. Griffin
 Cp. Hamilton
 Cp. Handrich
 Cp. Hartell
 Cp. Henry, Taegu 
 Cp. Hialeah 
 Cp. Hill
 Cp. Holiday 
 Cp. Houston
 Cp. Hovey 
 Cp. Howard, Suhawhnee
 Cp. Howze
 Cp. Humphrey 
 Cp. Huston
 Cp. Indian 
 Cp. Irwin
 Cp. Jackson 
 Cp. Jeb Stuart
 Cp. Jessup
 Cp. Jecelin, Uijongbu
 Cp. Johnson
 Cp. Jonathan Williams
 Cp. Kaiser 
 Cp. Kim, Seoul
 Cp. Kitty Hawk (Renamed * Cp. Bonifas)
 Cp. Knox, Pobwoni
 Cp. Kwangsa-ri
 Cp. Kyle
 Cp. Laguardia, Uijongbu 
 Cp. Lawton
 Cp. Lee
 Cp. Libby
 Cp. Liberty Bell
 Cp. Long
 Cp. Mackenzie
 Cp. Mcnabb, Cheju-do 
 Cp. Market, Bup Yong
 Cp. Matta
 Cp. Matthews
 Mcdonald Barracks
 Cp. Mcgovern
 Cp. Mcintyre
 Lester Mcmahan Barracks
 Cp. Mcnair, Pobwonni
 Cp. Mercer
 Cp. Meyer
 Cp. Mobile 
 Cp. Mosier
 Cp. Muchuck, Po'hang
 Cp. Nabors
 Cp. Nimble 
 Cp. Paine
 Cp. Page
 Panmunjom (Jsa - Joint Security Area)
 Cp. Parris
 Cp. Pelham
 Cp. Peterson
 Rc #1, Crossroads Service Club
 Rc #2, Camelot Hall Service Club
 Rc #3, Frontline Service Club
 Rc #4, Chogie Inn Service Club
 Cp. Pope 
 Cp. Red Cloud
 Cp. Reddick
 Cp. Rice (Renamed * Cp. Garry Owen)
 Cp. Richmond, O Sa Ri
 Cp. Ringgold
 Cp. Roberts, Yongdong Po
 Cp. Rodstrom
 Cp. Rose, Pan Ae
 Cp. Ross, Munsani
 Saa
 Cp. Sabre, Munsan
 Salamanca
 Cp. Sammi
 Cp. Santa Barbara
 Cp. Sarafi
 Cp. Sears 
 Cp. Semper Fedelis (Renamed * Cp. Ashworth)
 Cp. Sill
 Cp. Sitman
 Cp. Snow
 Cp. Spade
 Cp. Stanley
 Cp. Stanton
 Cp. Story
 Cp. Summerall
 Suwon 
 Cp. Sykes
 Cp. Thompson
 Cp. Woods
 Cp. Wagner
 Cp. Walker, Taegu
 Cp. Walley
 Cp. Warner, Pobwonni
 Warrior Base
 Cp. Wentzel
 Cp. Wilber
 Cp. Wilson
 Cp. Young
 Yongsan Garrison

Circa 1982 the 2nd Infantry Division occupied 17 camps, 27 sites, and 6 combat guard posts.

See also  
 List of United States military bases
 Camp Mujuk, Only US Marine Corps Base in South Korea

External links

Further reading

Sources

 
  Article contributed  by the Public Affairs Office, Headquarters, US Forces, Korea.

References